John Ernest Miller (May 30, 1941 – June 5, 2020) was an American professional baseball player. He played in all or part of five seasons in Major League Baseball for the Baltimore Orioles between 1962 through 1967.

Professional career 
Miller was originally signed as an amateur free agent prior to the 1961 season by the Baltimore Orioles and pitched his first game as a Big Leaguer at age 21. He was part of the 1966 World Series championship team, although he did not appear in the postseason. Plagued with shoulder problems throughout his career, his contract was purchased from the Orioles by the New York Mets on May 10, 1967, but he never appeared in a major league game for them, spending the remainder of the season with the Triple-A Jacksonville Suns. After spending 1968 with the independent High Point-Thomasville Hi-Toms of the Carolina League, Miller retired.

Personal life 
Miller was born in Baltimore, Maryland. He grew up in the Irvington neighborhood (Southwest Baltimore) and graduated from Edmondson High School. After baseball, he became a Baltimore County firefighter.

Miller died on June 5, 2020.

References

External links

 Klingaman, Mike. "Catching up with...former Oriole John Miller," The Toy Department (The Baltimore Sun sports blog), Sunday, April 17, 2011.

Major League Baseball pitchers
Baltimore Orioles players
Fox Cities Foxes players
Victoria Rosebuds players
Elmira Pioneers players
Rochester Red Wings players
Indianapolis Indians players
Jacksonville Suns players
High Point-Thomasville Hi-Toms players
Baseball players from Baltimore
1941 births
2020 deaths